Sapuan (autonym: səpuar) is a Mon–Khmer language spoken in the single village of Ban Sapuan, located approximately 40 km north of Attapeu. Jacq and Sidwell (1999) provide a short grammar. Sidwell (2003) reports a population of just under 1,000. Chazée (1999:93) gives a lower estimate of 480.

References

External links 
Sidwell, Paul (2003). A Handbook of comparative Bahnaric, Vol. 1: West Bahnaric. Pacific Linguistics, 551. Canberra: Research School of Pacific and Asian Studies, Australian National University
Jacq, Pascale and Paul Sidwell (1999). "Sapuan (Səpuar)." Lincom Europa. München.
 http://projekt.ht.lu.se/rwaai RWAAI (Repository and Workspace for Austroasiatic Intangible Heritage)
 http://hdl.handle.net/10050/00-0000-0000-0003-9041-C@view Sapuar in RWAAI Digital Archive

Bahnaric languages
Languages of Laos